Perimangelia is a genus of sea snails, marine gastropod mollusks in the family Mangeliidae.

Species
 Perimangelia interfossa (Carpenter, 1864)
 Perimangelia nitens (Carpenter, 1864)

References

 McLean J. H. (2000). Four new genera for northeastern Pacific gastropods. The Nautilus. 114: 99-102. page(s): 101

External links
 
 Worldwide Mollusc Species Data Base: Mangeliidae
 Bouchet, P.; Kantor, Y. I.; Sysoev, A.; Puillandre, N. (2011). A new operational classification of the Conoidea (Gastropoda). Journal of Molluscan Studies. 77(3): 273-308

 
Gastropods described in 2000
Gastropod genera